Visa requirements for Taiwan passport holders are administrative entry restrictions by the authorities of other states placed on nationals of the Republic of China (ROC), commonly known as Taiwan. Although the ROC has only one type of nationality under its nationality law, its nationals' right of abode in Taiwan is based on whether they have established household registration in Taiwan, hence ROC nationals are divided into two categories: nationals with household registration ("NWHRs"), with right of abode in Taiwan; and nationals without household registration ("NWOHRs"), without right of abode in Taiwan. Only NWHRs are entitled to a National Identification Card, and the National ID number is imprinted on the passport's biodata page to signify the holder's status as an NWHR. Holders of such passports can travel to more countries and territories without visas than holders of passports without National ID number, as NWOHRs using ROC passports to enter Taiwan require an entry permit and are subject to immigration controls.

The Taiwan passport is one of the five passports with the most improved rating globally since 2006 in terms of number of countries that its holders may visit without a visa. As of 28 January 2023, nationals of Republic of China with rights of abode in Taiwan had visa-free or visa on arrival access to 146 countries and territories, ranking the ordinary Taiwan passport 32nd in terms of travel freedom, according to the Henley Passport Index.

Visa requirements map

Visa requirements 
Many countries require passport validity of no less than 6 months and one or two blank pages. Visa requirements for holders of normal passports travelling for tourist purposes:

Other Visa requirements

APEC Business Travel Card

Holders of an APEC Business Travel Card (ABTC)  travelling on business do not require a visa to the following countries:

1 – up to 90 days
2 – up to 60 days
3 – up to 59 days

Although  is a member of this program, its nationals are also not allowed to use ABTC to enter  Mainland China, instead they are required to use Taiwan Compatriot Permits.

The card must be used in conjunction with a passport and has the following advantages:
undertake legitimate business in participating economies
expedited border crossing in all member economies, including transitional members
expedited scheduling of visa interview (United States)

Vaccination
Many African countries, including Angola, Benin, Burkina Faso, Cameroon, Central African Republic, Chad, Democratic Republic of the Congo, Republic of the Congo, Côte d'Ivoire, Equatorial Guinea, Gabon, Ghana, Guinea, Liberia, Mali, Mauritania, Niger, Rwanda, São Tomé and Príncipe, Senegal, Sierra Leone, Uganda, Zambia require all incoming passengers to have a current International Certificate of Vaccination. Some other countries require vaccination only if the passenger is coming from an infected area.

Dependent, disputed or restricted territories
Visa requirements for nationals of Republic of China for visits to various territories, disputed areas, partially recognized countries, and restricted zones:

Greater China 
ROC nationals without household registration (NWOHRs) are required to obtain a Chinese Travel Document from a Chinese embassy, consulate or diplomatic mission prior to travelling to Hong Kong SAR and Mainland China. As Chinese Travel Documents are issued as a replacement of the Chinese passport, all holders of Taiwan passports who have citizenship or nationality of another country are ineligible and are required to apply for a Chinese visa on their non-ROC passports instead.

Notes:
Single-entry Mainland Travel Permit for Taiwan Residents can be applied with ROC passport (with a validity of more than 3 months), ROC National ID card, return ticket and 2 passport-sized photos, fee is CNY 150. Some airports may require additional documents, such as an invitation letter. Eligible airports are: Beijing, Changchun, Changsha, Chengdu, Chongqing, Dalian, Fuzhou, Guilin, Guiyang, Haikou, Hangzhou, Harbin, Hefei, Jinan, Kunming, Nanchang, Nanjing, Nanning, Ningbo, Qingdao, Quanzhou, Sanya, Shanghai, Shenyang, Shenzhen, Tianjin, Wenzhou, Wuhan, Wuxi, Xiamen, Xi'an, Xuzhou, Yancheng, Yantai and Zhengzhou. The single-entry travel permit is valid for a stay up to 3 months. Holder of a valid, long-term travel permit is not eligible to use this service, he or she must instead carry the long-term permit or will be refused entry for not doing so.

Other

 — Certain countries will deny access to holders of Israeli visas or passport stamps of Israel because of the Arab League boycott of Israel.

See also

 Visa policy of Taiwan
 Taiwan passport
 List of nationalities forbidden at border

References and Notes
References

Notes

Foreign relations of Taiwan
Taiwan